Saurita hemiphaea is a moth in the subfamily Arctiinae. It was described by Paul Dognin in 1909. It is found in French Guiana.

References

Natural History Museum Lepidoptera generic names catalog

Moths described in 1909
Saurita